Robert Prosinečki (born 12 January 1969) is a Croatian professional football manager and former player who played as a midfielder. 

Early in his career, he was part of the Red Star Belgrade team that won three Yugoslav First League titles and the European Cup in 1991. Prosinečki spent several years in Spain with rivals Real Madrid and Barcelona, as well as Oviedo and Sevilla. Later in his career, he won three Croatian league titles with Dinamo Zagreb, and also played in Belgium, England and Slovenia.

Internationally, Prosinečki was voted best player as Yugoslavia won the 1987 FIFA World Youth Championship, and came runner-up with the under-21 team at the 1990 European Championship. He was also voted Best Young Player at the 1990 FIFA World Cup. He earned 49 caps for Croatia between 1994 and 2002, playing at UEFA Euro 1996 and the World Cups of 1998 and 2002, helping the team to third place in 1998.

After retiring from active football, Prosinečki worked as assistant manager of the Croatia national team between 2006 and 2010, before being appointed manager of Red Star Belgrade in December 2010. He left in 2012 for Turkish club Kayserispor two months later. Internationally, Prosinečki worked as head coach of the Azerbaijan national team from 2014 to 2017 and of Bosnia and Herzegovina from 2018 to 2019. He then once again managed Kayserispor, Denizlispor and Olimpija Ljubljana.

Early life and career
Prosinečki was born in Schwenningen, West Germany, into a family of Yugoslav gastarbeiters of mixed ethnicity. His father Đuro was a Croat, hailing from the Gornji Čemehovec village near Kraljevec na Sutli, and his mother Emilija Đoković is a Serb, originally from the Ježevica village near Čačak.

He spent his childhood in West Germany before moving back to SR Croatia with his family in 1979, at the age of ten. By that time he had already been playing in the Stuttgarter Kickers youth system. Once in Croatia, he continued in the youth setup of Dinamo Zagreb.

Club career

Dinamo Zagreb
After moving up the youth ranks for years, Prosinečki started getting occasional first team appearances during the 1986–87 league season under head coach Miroslav Blažević. On his league debut versus Željezničar on 2 November 1986, the seventeen-year-old managed to score in a 2–1 home win. By the end of the season, he recorded one more league appearance: playing the second half versus Sloboda Tuzla on 12 April 1987, a goalless home draw.

Wanting to secure his son's financial future, Prosinečki's father Đuro started pushing within the club hierarchy for a professional contract to be given to his eighteen-year-old son. However, coach Miroslav Blažević sent him away, famously claiming that he would eat his coaching diploma if Prosinečki ever became a real football player.

Red Star Belgrade
In the summer of 1987, Đuro Prosinečki took Robert over to Belgrade and got the professional contract they were after. Dragan Džajić, Red Star's then technical director, remembers how the transfer got initiated: 

Despite evident quality and obvious technical ability, in order to further assess an unproven prospect who hadn't been on their radar, Red Star management reportedly also inquired about Prosinečki—as well as about the player-management relations and overall atmosphere within Dinamo—with their own defender Milivoj Bračun who had spent years at Dinamo before moving to Belgrade.

Immediately upon joining his new club, Prosinečki became a first team regular and furthermore, much to Blažević's chagrin, also rapidly established himself as one of Yugoslavia's most gifted and talented players. Playing under head coach Vasović, the youngster secured a regular spot in Red Star's midfield alongside Dragan Stojković, Žarko Đurović, and Goran Milojević just a few weeks into the 1987–88 league season, opening his Red Star scoring account in the process during only his second match for the club—a 7–1 home rout of FC Prishtina on 9 August 1987.

In October 1987, he was part of the Yugoslav youth squad which won the World Youth Championship in Chile, with Prosinečki winning the Golden Ball award as the tournament's best player. Playing in Chile meant that he was away from the club for the entire month of October, and he was already held in such high regard at Red Star, that the club brass attempted to bring him back from South America after the tournament's group stages, so that he could play in their 1987–88 UEFA Cup second round tie versus Club Brugge. The Yugoslav team players protested to FIFA, and João Havelange, the organisation's chairman at the time, intervened to keep Prosinečki in Chile.

During his four-year spell at the club, Prosinečki helped Red Star win three Yugoslav First League titles and one Yugoslav Cup, as well as participating in the club's greatest success in history by winning the 1991 European Cup.

Real Madrid
Prosinečki joined Spanish giants Real Madrid during the summer of 1991 for a transfer fee of ₧ 450 million (€15 million). Led by club president Ramón Mendoza and head coach Radomir Antić, the club had huge expectations from their expensive and highly rated signing. Real were coming off a difficult season during which they made two coaching changes before barely managing a UEFA Cup spot by finishing third in La Liga under Antić, their third head coach that season.

However, pretty much immediately, 22-year-old Prosinečki got sidelined with a string of muscular injuries. Administered by team doctors, he underwent a series of tests as well as a strict dietary regime in addition to getting forced into changing many lifestyle-related habits. Still, the first season turned out to be a complete write-off: he appeared in only three league matches with a notable shining moment — scoring a free-kick goal versus FC Barcelona in El Clásico on 19 October 1991.

Although injury-riddled as well, Prosinečki's second season at Real did provide a hint of a breakthrough with 29 league appearances and three goals, however, it was still far off the expectations indicated by his reputation and price tag.

His best season at Real, 1993–94, was incidentally his last, with six league goals.

Rest of his stay in Spain
During the 1994 summer transfer window, Real brass decided that Prosinečki's physical fragility and injuries were too much to deal with and offloaded the twenty-five-year-old to Real Oviedo on a loan deal. Reuniting with Radomir Antić–the same head coach who brought him to Real three years earlier–Prosinečki played his best season yet in Spain, even winning a league match against his former club Real Madrid in May 1995. 
He stood out for his good performances as an organizer, he recovered his best level and he felt more satisfied with his physical and psychological state. He also started being a regular in the Croatia national team. In his statements to the press reflected "I'm enjoying my football" and reaffirmed his intention to leave Real Madrid without fulfilling the fifth year of contract he had left.

The arrival of his manager from Oviedo, Radomir Antić to Atlético Madrid motivated Atlético to reach an agreement with Real Madrid to whom Prosinečki was still contracted to. However, FC Barcelona interfered in the operation and presented Zoran Vekić, the Croatian's agent, with a better offer. While the interest of the Colchoneros was made public, the other bid was not leaked to the press. At the end, Prosinečki became a free agent, he rejected Atlético and signed on 20 July 1995 to FC Barcelona with a contract of €3 million for three seasons, plus two optional. Ramón Mendoza did not want his eternal rival to take the midfielder free, but the bad economic situation of Real Madrid precipitated his departure.

In Barcelona he suffered muscle injuries again that made him miss the first part of the season. By the time he recovered, coach Johan Cruyff did not trust him and relegated him to the substitution bench, so he only played 19 games in the 1995–96 season. The following season, manager Bobby Robson reduced Prosinečki to friendly matches. After this, Prosinečki wanted to leave. On 14 December 1996, he was bought by Sevilla for €1.67 million. He played for the club for the rest of the season and was always a first choice pick for the team.

Croatia Zagreb
In 1997, he returned home to play for Croatia Zagreb (Dinamo's name at the time) for a fee of €2.5 million. His arrival was very well received by the fans and meant the return of the midfielder to the club where he began his professional career.

During his first season, he won the double with the team and reached the third round in the UEFA Cup, where Prosinečki's performances where a key factor to victory against MTK Hungária and Grasshopper.

The next two seasons saw Prosinečki lead as captain one of the best generations of Dinamo Zagreb, winning the league twice and playing in the UEFA Champions League also two seasons in a row. In their European campaign, Dinamo reached their best result in the competition. Prosinečki will be remembered by the fans most notably for his performances against Celtic and Manchester United.

Hrvatski Dragovoljac and Standard Liège
On 14 July 2000, Prosinečki signed to Hrvatski Dragovoljac as a free agent. The club president Stjepan Spajić said Prosinečki would sign a two-year contract with a clause that he could leave if a foreign club would make an offer to him.

In January 2001, he moved again to Standard Liège where he played until the end of the season, finishing third in the Belgian First Division.

Portsmouth
In summer of 2001, 32-year-old Prosinečki signed for Division 1 (second-tier of the English football league system) side Portsmouth on a one-year deal. He was signed by the club's Yugoslav owner, Milan Mandarić.

Prosinečki is still held as a folk hero at Portsmouth for his performances in the centre of the midfield. The team were saved from relegation through his goals and assists in the 2001–02 season, the highlight of which was scoring a hat-trick against Barnsley in a 4–4 home draw on 2 February 2002. It was the only hat-trick of his career, and he refused the customary match ball at the end of the game as his team had not won. 

At the end of the 2007–08 Premier League season, the readers of The News picked Prosinečki as part of an all-time best Portsmouth eleven. He was the only non-British player to be among the selection. After speaking with Prosinečki, fellow Croat Niko Kranjčar made the decision to sign for Portsmouth in the summer of 2006.

Later career
Prosinečki then had a one-year stint at Olimpija Ljubljana. With Olimpija Ljubljana Prosinečki won his last trophy, the 2002–03 Slovenian Cup; he even scored a goal in the final.
 
Prosinečki played one more professional season in his home country for NK Zagreb.

In spring 2005, he ended his career in low tier club Savski Marof.

International career
Prosinečki had 49 caps for Croatia and scored 10 goals for his country. He was also capped 15 times, scoring four goals, for Yugoslavia. In 1987, he was named the tournament's best player as Yugoslavia won the World Youth Championship in Chile along with fellow Croatians Zvonimir Boban, Robert Jarni, Davor Šuker and Igor Štimac.

Prosinečki then played for Yugoslavia at the 1990 World Cup, and for Croatia at Euro 1996 and the 1998 and 2002 World Cups. It was at the 1998 World Cup that Prosinečki and the Croatian squad managed a historic third-place finish, with Prosinečki scoring two goals throughout the tournament, including one in Croatia's 2–1 victory over the Netherlands in the bronze-medal match; as a result, he is the only player in history to have scored World Cup finals goals for two different national teams.

In 1990, Prosinečki scored one goal for Yugoslavia in a group match against the United Arab Emirates and eight years later, he added two goals for Croatia by scoring in a group match against Jamaica and in the third place match against the Netherlands. He played in a total of nine World Cup matches, three for Yugoslavia in 1990 and six for Croatia in 1998 and 2002.

Style of play
Prosinečki, nicknamed Žuti (the Yellow One) throughout his career due to his blond hair, was considered one of the most creative and technically skilled footballers who emerged from Eastern Europe in the 1980s. His favourite position was that of a pure midfielder, although he often also played as a right winger or as an attacking midfielder, and delayed his relocation to the centre of the pitch in order to elaborate and organize the attacking plays of his teammates with his passing, as the number 10 role best utilized his excellent vision of the game. He used to retain possession due to his dribbling skills and would impose his pace on rivals with his passing and ability to exploit spaces. On a technical level, he stood out for his ability to pass short, dribble, and drive forward with the ball. He also had a strong shot that made him dangerous from set pieces.

His style was criticized at times by some Real Madrid fans, although he was often played out of position during his time in the Spanish capital. Vicente del Bosque, his last coach with the team, recovered him for the playmaker role and defined his performances in the following way:

Prosinečki has stated that out of the coaches he played for his favourite was Johan Cruyff.

His biggest weaknesses as a footballer were his proneness to muscle injuries (which saw him sidelined for almost the entire 1991–92 season), his poor defensive work-rate, his inconsistency, and his motivation. He also reproached himself for his addiction to tobacco.

Managerial career

Early career
Prosinečki began his managerial career in 2004 as an assistant to Mile Petković at NK Zagreb.

In 2006, he was named the assistant to head coach Slaven Bilić in the Croatia national football team. He went with them to UEFA Euro 2008.

Red Star Belgrade

In December 2010, during the 2010–11 Serbian SuperLiga mid-season winter break, Prosinečki was announced as the new manager of Red Star Belgrade, replacing recently released Aleksandar Kristić. Returning to the club of his biggest playing successes, the announcement made major headlines all over the Balkans and also generated plenty of buzz in the rest of Europe. The angle of Prosinečki being the first Croatian to coach in Serbia following the Yugoslav Wars also got a lot of attention. His annual salary was not officially disclosed, however, Serbian press speculated with figures from US$100,000 to $250,000 per year.

At the time of Prosinečki taking over, fifteen matches into the league season, the famous yet recently beleaguered Serbian club was in second place, five points behind league leaders FK Partizan. Red Star brass led by club president Vladan Lukić (Prosinečki's former teammate at Marakana) thus steered clear of stating league title as an explicit requirement for the club legend, still, it was understood that making an outside run at the title remained a priority. Prosinečki announced his intent to mold Red Star into an attacking team that utilizes short-passing game to break down opponents, picking Slobodan Marović and Žarko Đurović (also Red Star colleagues from playing days) to be his assistants. Immediately, however, the issue of Prosinečki's pro coaching licence came up when it was discovered that he may not yet meet criteria for one, which according to Serbian SuperLiga rules would preclude him from being physically present on the sidelines during official matches. The things were straightened out by the time league restarted and Prosinečki's bench debut, which was scheduled to take place versus FK Smederevo at Marakana on 26 February 2011.

His side finished in second place, six points off bitter rivals Partizan. The following season, 2011–12, his side again finished in second place and again second to Partizan, this time the margin was doubled from six to twelve points. In August 2012 Prosinečki resigned as manager of Red Star, even though he won the 2011–12 Serbian Cup after beating Borac Čačak in the final 2–0, on 16 May 2012.

Kayserispor
On 15 October 2012, it was announced that Prosinečki would replace Shota Arveladze as manager of struggling Kayserispor in the Turkish Super League. He became the new head coach of Kayserispor at the 8th week of the 2012–13 Süper Lig, and he gained 13 wins in 27 league matches and finished the league at 5th position.

The start of the 2013–14 season was not so successful for Prosinečki and his team. After achieving only one victory in 11 rounds, Kayserispor was at the bottom of the league table. In November 2013 Prosinečki resigned but his resignation was not accepted by the club board. A month and a half later, the club record had not improved. Kayserispor was 17th on the Süper Lig table and lost to Tokatspor in the Turkish Cup. In the last days of 2013 Prosinečki definitively resigned as manager of Kayserispor.

Azerbaijan
On 1 December 2014, Prosinečki was named the new manager of the Azerbaijan national football team, replacing Berti Vogts with a two-year contract until UEFA Euro 2016. His contract fee was reported around $1.5 million. After three years spent in Azerbaijan, it was announced that he did not extend his contract for two more years with the Azerbaijan Football Association and left the team shortly after. Prosinečki is considered one of the finest coaches of Azerbaijan national team along with Berti Vogts.
Under his guidance Azerbaijan played well, having drawn against Croatia 0–0, undefeated against Norway, an away draw against Czech Republic, victory over Qatar 2–0, victory over Malta 2–0, and biggest victory in Azerbaijan history – 5–1 against San Marino. Despite this, he opted to leave Azerbaijan, having failed to guide Azerbaijan to qualify for any major competitions.

Bosnia and Herzegovina
On 4 January 2018, Prosinečki was named the new manager of the Bosnia and Herzegovina national football team.

On 15 November 2018, after a goalless draw against Austria in the 2018–19 UEFA Nations League, Bosnia and Herzegovina topped its group and got promoted to the League A of the 2020–21 UEFA Nations League. With that draw, Prosinečki tied Safet Sušić's record with a 10-game unbeaten run in all official matches as Bosnia and Herzegovina national team manager. He secured play-offs for Euro 2020 by topping the group.

On 18 November, Prosinečki had a chance to make a new, 11-game unbeaten run record against Spain in a friendly match, but he did not, as Bosnia and Herzegovina lost 1–0 with a 78th-minute goal from Brais Méndez to secure Spain a win. Even though Bosnia and Herzegovina lost, throughout the whole match they were considered an equal opponent by some and some thought it showed what kind of change Prosinečki had made to the players and to their mentality and style of play.

His biggest win as the Bosnia and Herzegovina national team head coach came on 5 September 2019, in a 5–0 home win against Liechtenstein in the UEFA Euro 2020 qualifiers.

On 8 September 2019, three days after the victory over Lichtenstein, Prosinečki resigned from the position of Bosnia and Herzegovina national team head coach after a 2–4 away loss against Armenia, thus losing almost every direct chance of qualifying for the Euros. Two days later, on 10 September, Prosinečki decided to remain as head coach. He stated that after talks with the Bosnia and Herzegovina FA board of directors, they eventually convinced him to withdraw the decision. His campaign during the qualifying had already been depressing, as Bosnia and Herzegovina suffered a shock 0–2 away loss to Finland, a poor 2–2 home draw with Greece and a 1–2 away defeat to Italy before the humiliating 2–4 loss away to Armenia.

Upon his first games following his decision to withdrawal the resignation as coach of the national team, Bosnia and Herzegovina managed to convincingly defeat Finland 4–1 at home soil to keep them on the race for the Euro spot. However, Bosnia and Herzegovina fell 1–2 away to already eliminated Greece, that unofficially eliminated Bosnia and Herzegovina from qualifying directly.

On 27 November 2019, it was announced that Prosinečki and the Bosnia and Herzegovina FA had reached mutual agreement for him to leave his role.

Return to Kayserispor
On 29 December 2019, Prosinečki came back to Kayserispor, managing the club for a second time in his managerial career and managing a club for the first time in over six years. On 6 August 2020, he left the club after rejecting a two-year contract extension because of the club's transfer policy for the following season, which was conditioned by a transfer limit determined by the Turkish Football Federation.

Denizlispor
On 10 August 2020, Prosinečki was named the new manager of Denizlispor. He resigned on 24 November after a disappointing start to the season.

Olimpija Ljubljana
On 22 March 2022, Prosinečki signed a two-year contract with Slovenian PrvaLiga side Olimpija Ljubljana, replacing fellow countryman Dino Skender. He left the club on 1 July 2022, together with sporting director Mladen Rudonja, after a dispute with club owner Adam Delius.

Minifootball
Prosinečki has also participated in Minifootball tournaments in Kutija Šibica. He won first place in 1989 with Termotehna Šela, 1998 with team Moby Dick Segafredo and in 2002, 2003, 2004 with team Riva Grupa. In 1997, Moby Dick came in second place. In 2003, Prosinečki was awarded best player of the tournament.

Prosinečki even coached a team named Promotionplay in 2006 where they lost 5–0 in the final.

On 26 December 2017, Prosinečki played at a humanitarian tournament Četiri kafića (Four cafés). Prosinečki got a standing ovation from the fans in Arena Gripe during his performances while playing.

Entrepreneurship
In March 2007, several years following the end of his football playing career, Prosinečki decided to invest some of his earnings into launching a restaurant in Zagreb. Named Prosikito, after the nickname Spanish press gave him during his time in La Liga, the restaurant is located in the Zagreb neighbourhood of Stara Peščenica and is run day-to-day by his younger brother Sven Daniel.

In late February 2016, in partnership with another retired footballer, Janko Janković, Prosinečki opened an 8-court indoor padel commercial facility called Padel.hr at the Zagreb Fair. Prosinečki and Janković became aware of padel — a simplified version of tennis with elements of squash — during their respective professional footballing stints in Spain and decided to try to monetize it back home where it is largely unknown. After struggling to attract patrons initially, the facility has reportedly recorded significant growth since with 7,000 registered players.

Controversy

Relationship with Ćiro Blažević
During the late 1980s and early 1990s, parallel with Prosinečki's rise to football superstardom at Red Star Belgrade, Real Madrid, Barcelona as well as Yugoslav and Croatian national teams, the story of him being chased away from Dinamo Zagreb in 1987 by the famous coach Ćiro Blažević grew in Croatian and Yugoslav media and public. To this day it is often cited and referenced as an example of football mismanagement, poor player selection, and bad work with youth categories. Colourful Blažević, the villain of the piece, rarely talked on the record about the circumstances of Prosinečki's departure. However, in 2010, Blažević deflected responsibility for the flap by claiming he actually gave the youngster a four-year contract that was eventually, according to Blažević, annulled by Dinamo president Ante Pavlović on a technicality due to not being processed administratively by the subfederation responsible. On the same occasion, Blažević went on to accuse Prosinečki's father Đuro of not negotiating in good faith with Dinamo by saying "he already had his combination with Red Star". Asked about his famous quote about eating his diploma if Prosinečki ever became a player, Blažević responded that he only used it as a motivation tool.

Blažević and Prosinečki would reignite their simmering feud eleven years later during the 1998 World Cup where they were part of the Croatian national team that made it all the way to the semi-finals. In the semi-final match that Croatia lost 1–2 versus eventual winners France after going ahead 1–0, Blažević decided to leave 29-year-old Prosinečki on the bench (he eventually entered the contest in the 90th minute, coming on for Mario Stanić), which led to a lot of criticism.

Court case versus Dinamo
In the summer of 1997, twenty-eight-year-old Prosinečki came back to Zagreb in order to play for the club where he had started his professional career eleven years earlier, Dinamo Zagreb. Now called "Croatia Zagreb", the club was turned into a state project bankrolled by the Croatian government's highest echelons and personally supported by the country's president Franjo Tuđman. By 2000, Prosinečki left Croatia Zagreb, but in late 2001, decided to initiate a lawsuit against the club (whose name had been restored back to Dinamo in the meantime due to continuous fan protests) over DM1,550,000 (€750,000) in unpaid wages.

Years later in 2009, the court ruled against Prosinečki, asserting that the lawsuit against Dinamo had no merit since Prosinečki played for Croatia Zagreb, and not Dinamo Zagreb. Commenting on the verdict in late 2009, Prosinečki said he was cheated out of his money.

Personal life
In June 1999, Prosinečki married his girlfriend Vlatka. The couple have two daughters.

Prosinečki smoked cigarettes throughout his career playing professional football, which many of his former teammates talked about in form of anecdotes.

Career statistics

Club

International

Scores and results list Yugoslavia's and Croatia's goal tally first, score column indicates score after each Prosinečki goal.

Honours

Player
Red Star Belgrade 
Yugoslav First League: 1987–88, 1989–90, 1990–91
Yugoslav Cup: 1989–90
European Cup: 1990–91

Real Madrid 
Copa del Rey: 1992–93
Supercopa de España: 1993
Copa Iberoamericana: 1994

Dinamo Zagreb 
Croatian First League: 1997–98, 1998–99, 1999–2000
Croatian Cup: 1997–98

Olimpija Ljubljana 
Slovenian Cup: 2002–03

Yugoslavia U20
FIFA World Youth Championship: 1987

Yugoslavia U21
UEFA European Under-21 Championship runner-up: 1990

Croatia 
FIFA World Cup third place: 1998

Individual
FIFA World Youth Championship Golden Ball: 1987
FIFA World Cup Best Young Player: 1990
Yugoslav Footballer of the Year: 1990
Večernji list football player of the year: 1990, 1997
Bravo Award: 1991
1991 FIFA World Player of the Year: 4th place
1991 Ballon d'Or: 5th place
Croatian Footballer of the Year: 1997
Franjo Bučar State Award for Sport (2): 1997, 1998
PFA First Division Team of the Year: 2001–02
Portsmouth F.C. All-time XI
Only non-British player to be voted into all-time best Portsmouth eleven
6th Zvezdina zvezda

Manager
Red Star Belgrade 
Serbian Cup: 2011–12

Orders
Order of Danica Hrvatska with the face of Franjo Bučar: 1995
Order of the Croatian Trefoil: 1998

References

External links

Robert Prosinečki interview at Extra-Football.com
Robert Prosinečki at the Serbia national football team website

1969 births
Living people
People from Villingen-Schwenningen
Sportspeople from Freiburg (region)
Footballers from Baden-Württemberg
German people of Croatian descent
Croatian people of Serbian descent
German people of Serbian descent
Association football midfielders
Yugoslav footballers
Yugoslavia international footballers
1990 FIFA World Cup players
Croatian footballers
Croatia international footballers
UEFA Euro 1996 players
1998 FIFA World Cup players
2002 FIFA World Cup players
Dual internationalists (football)
GNK Dinamo Zagreb players
Red Star Belgrade footballers
Real Madrid CF players
Real Oviedo players
FC Barcelona players
Sevilla FC players
NK Hrvatski Dragovoljac players
Standard Liège players
Portsmouth F.C. players
NK Olimpija Ljubljana (1945–2005) players
NK Zagreb players
Yugoslav First League players
La Liga players
Croatian Football League players
Belgian Pro League players
English Football League players
Slovenian PrvaLiga players
Croatian expatriate footballers
Expatriate footballers in Spain
Croatian expatriate sportspeople in Spain
Expatriate footballers in Belgium
Croatian expatriate sportspeople in Belgium
Expatriate footballers in England
Croatian expatriate sportspeople in England
Expatriate footballers in Slovenia
Croatian expatriate sportspeople in Slovenia
Croatian football managers
Red Star Belgrade managers
Kayserispor managers
Azerbaijan national football team managers
Bosnia and Herzegovina national football team managers
Denizlispor managers
NK Olimpija Ljubljana (2005) managers
Serbian SuperLiga managers
Süper Lig managers
Croatian expatriate football managers
Expatriate football managers in Serbia
Croatian expatriate sportspeople in Serbia
Expatriate football managers in Turkey
Croatian expatriate sportspeople in Turkey
Expatriate football managers in Azerbaijan
Croatian expatriate sportspeople in Azerbaijan
Expatriate football managers in Bosnia and Herzegovina
Croatian expatriate sportspeople in Bosnia and Herzegovina
Expatriate football managers in Slovenia